Dame Jane Alison Glover  (born 13 May 1949) is a British-born conductor and musicologist.

Early life

Born at Helmsley, Glover attended Haberdashers' Monmouth School for Girls. Her father, Robert Finlay Glover, MA (TCD), was headmaster of Monmouth School and it was through this connection that she was able to meet Benjamin Britten and Peter Pears aged only 16. She later described the meeting:

"I was beside myself with the prospect of hearing them perform. On the afternoon of the concert, the doorbell rang at the headmaster's house, and I went to answer it. There on the step, looking for all the world as they did on one of my record sleeves, distinguished, elegant and with the kindliest of eyes, were Peter Pears and Benjamin Britten my hero."

After reading Music as an undergraduate at St Hugh's College, Oxford, she went on to complete a DPhil on 17th-century Venetian Opera. Dr Glover has published a 1978 biography of Francesco Cavalli, and included material derived from her doctoral thesis.

In 1990, after a sizeable donation, the Glover Music School was opened at Monmouth School by Jane Glover, in memory of her father. Her brother, Richard Glover, served as Master Haberdasher (2015–16).

Career

Glover first conducted at Oxford as a student, in a production of Athalia, and went on to conduct the first performance in modern times of Cavalli's Rosinda for the Oxford University Opera Club in October 1973. 

She made her professional debut at the Wexford Festival in 1975 with the first modern performance of Eritrea and joined Glyndebourne in 1979. She was music director of Glyndebourne Touring Opera from 1981 to 1985. She has been both principal conductor and principal guest conductor of the Huddersfield Choral Society and continues to work with the choir on a semi-regular basis. She conducted the world premiere of Il Giardino by Stephen Oliver at the Batignano Festival in 1977.

During the 1980s, Glover regularly broadcast on BBC Television including hosting the television series Orchestra with Jane Glover in 1983 and Mozart – His Life with Music in 1985.

Glover was the Music Director of the London Mozart Players from 1984 to 1991. Glover was a BBC governor from 1990 to 1995. Since 2002, she has been Music Director of the Chicago ensemble Music of the Baroque.

She holds a number of honorary degrees from several universities, is a Fellow of the Royal College of Music and was the artistic director of opera at the Royal Academy of Music between 2009 and 2016. On 18 March 2011, she conducted the world première of Sir Peter Maxwell Davies's opera Kommilitonen! at the Academy.

Glover was appointed a Commander of the Order of the British Empire (CBE) in the 2003 New Year Honours and a Dame Commander of the Order of the British Empire (DBE) in the 2021 New Year Honours for services to music.

In September 2005, Macmillan published Glover's book Mozart's Women: His Family, His Friends, His Music. The book investigates the extent to which the women surrounding Mozart – his mother, sister, wife and his wife's sisters – influenced his development as a composer. In 2018, her Handel in London: The Making of a Genius, was published, which charts the composer's work as "immigrant musical genius, composer, performer and impresario", placed in the social and political context of London of the time.

She has conducted opera at Royal Opera House, Covent Garden, English National Opera, Glyndebourne, Berlin Staatsoper, Royal Danish Opera, Opéra National du Rhin, Opéra National de Bordeaux, Glimmerglass Opera, New York City Opera, and Teatro La Fenice. In December 2013, she became the third woman ever to conduct at the Metropolitan Opera of New York, leading Mozart's The Magic Flute in the production of Julie Taymor; the New York Times wrote, "...Ms. Glover's appearance, and the magisterial performance and nuance she drew from the orchestra, were the news here." She has been a regular collaborator with choreographer Mark Morris.

Her recordings include Cavalli (La Calisto - extracts), Handel (Messiah; Water Music suites 1-3), Haydn (Symphonies 80, 87, 89, 101, 102, 103, 104; 'Harmoniemesse' and 'Schöpfungsmesse', Mozart (Symphonies 25, 26, 27, 28, 29, 30, 31, 32, 33, 35, 36, 38, 39, 40, 41; Divertimenti K. 136-K. 138 & Serenade K. 525, "Eine Kleine Nachtmusik"; Serenade for 13 Wind Instruments K361; Requiem K.626), Mendelssohn (Violin Concerto Op. 64; "A Midsummer Night's Dream" incidental music), Britten (Les Illuminations; Nocturne; Sinfonietta).

Works 
 
 Handel in London: The Making of a Genius. Pan Macmillan, 2018. .

References

External links
Music of the Baroque – biography on Jane Glover 
 Jane Glover's website

Interviews
Jane Glover interview, September 25, 2000

1949 births
Living people
BBC Governors
People from Monmouth, Wales
People educated at Haberdashers' Monmouth School for Girls
Alumni of St Hugh's College, Oxford
Fellows of St Hugh's College, Oxford
Women conductors (music)
British choral conductors
Music directors (opera)
British performers of early music
Women performers of early music
British biographers
Academics of the Royal Academy of Music
Dames Commander of the Order of the British Empire
21st-century British conductors (music)
Women music educators
21st-century women musicians